Juan Burgueño Pereira (4 February 1923 – 21 September 1997) was an Uruguayan footballer, who played for Danubio. In Argentina he played in the Club Atlanta.

For the Uruguay national football team, he was part of the 1950 FIFA World Cup winning team, but did not play in any matches in the tournament.

References
World Cup Champions Squads 1930 - 2002
A primeira grande zebra do Mundial 

1923 births
1997 deaths
Uruguayan footballers
Uruguay international footballers
1950 FIFA World Cup players
FIFA World Cup-winning players
Danubio F.C. players
Uruguayan Primera División players

Association football forwards